Sandy Peden (born 1934) is a Canadian sports shooter.

He has competed in the Commonwealth Games, representing Canada at Brisbane 1982 and Auckland 1990.

References

1934 births
Living people
Sportspeople from Edmonton
Canadian male sport shooters
Shooters at the 1982 Commonwealth Games
Shooters at the 1990 Commonwealth Games
Commonwealth Games competitors for Canada